Ilarion is a variant of the Greek given name Hilarion, found in Slavic and Romanian languages. It may refer to:

Hilarion of Kiev or Ilarion (11th century), Metropolitan of Kiev
Ilarion Buiuc (1891–1918), Bessarabian politician
Ilarion Roganović (1828–1882), Bishop of Cetinje and Metropolitan of Montenegro and the Highlands
Ilarion Ciobanu (1931–2008), Romanian actor
Ilarion Felea (1903–1961), Romanian Orthodox priest and theologian
Ilarion Ionescu-Galați (born 1937), Romanian violinist and orchestra conductor
Hilarion of Makariopolis or Ilarion (1812–1875), Bulgarian cleric
Ilarion Ruvarac (1832–1905), Serbian historian and Orthodox priest
Ilarion Ohienko, Metropolitan Ilarion (1882–1972), Ukrainian Orthodox cleric, linguist, and historian 
Ilarion Dragostinov (1852–1876), Bulgarian revolutionary
Ilarion Hrabovych (1856–1903), Ukrainian poet
Ilarion Radonić (1871–1932), Bishop of the Serbian Orthodox Church

See also

Illarion (name)
Hilario (name)
Hilarion (name)
Hilary (name)
Ilarion Ridge, Antarctica

Bulgarian masculine given names
Serbian masculine given names
Romanian masculine given names
Russian masculine given names
Ukrainian masculine given names